V. J. Smith is an American politician, author, and motivational speaker serving as a member of the South Dakota Senate from the 7th district. Elected in 2018, he assumed office in 2019. He is a member of the Republican Party.

Background 
One of four siblings, Smith was raised in South Dakota. He graduated from South Dakota State University in 1978.

After earning his bachelor's degree, he worked for AlliedSignal Aerospace Company in Kansas City, Missouri during the 1980s. In 1990, he returned to South Dakota State University to serve as the assistant athletic director. He served as the executive director of the SDSU Alumni Association from 1996 to 2007, resigning to pursue a career as a full-time public speaker. Smith is also the author of several books, including The Richest Man in Town, the biography of a Walmart employee in Brookings, South Dakota. As a public speaker, Smith frequently tours the United States to perform speeches at schools.

References 

Living people
Motivational speakers
American motivational speakers
South Dakota State University alumni
Republican Party South Dakota state senators
21st-century American politicians
Year of birth missing (living people)